The M1130 Commander Vehicle (CV) is an armored command vehicle based on the Stryker platform. It is used within the brigade to provide means to receive information, analyze and transmit data, and control forces carrying out combat missions. Models with the double V-hull upgrade are known as the M1255 CVV.

General
The CV provides an operational platform for elements of command within the Stryker Brigade Combat Team (SBCT). The CV integrates the C4ISR equipment for the unit commanders. It has the ability to access aircraft power and antenna systems to plan missions while en route aboard aircraft.

Operational capability
Commanders must have the capability to see and direct the battle continuously, maintaining the Common Relevant Operating Picture (CROP) for all friendly forces within their respective areas of operation. This enhanced situational awareness and understanding will enable commanders to synchronize and employ widely dispersed and highly mobile forces at decisive points of the operation. Initial fielding of the CV will be three platforms to the brigade headquarters, two platforms to the infantry maneuver battalion HQ, and two per infantry maneuver company within each battalion.

The CV is based on the Stryker Infantry carrier vehicle (ICV) platform due to the close parallels of operational requirements and battlefield capabilities between the two systems. The commonality of the platform reduces the maintenance footprint and variety of logistics support. The CV is an organic vehicle to the ICV maneuver formation.

See also
 List of U.S. military vehicles by model number

References
 

 This article incorporates work from https://web.archive.org/web/20080516205901/http://www.sbct.army.mil/product_cv.html, which is in the public domain as it is a work of the United States Military.

External links

Command vehicles
Post–Cold War armored fighting vehicles of the United States
General Dynamics land vehicles
Wheeled armoured fighting vehicles
Command vehicles of the United States Army
Mowag Piranha